Johan Andreas Hallén (22 December 1846 – 11 March 1925) was a Swedish Romantic composer, conductor and music teacher, primarily known for his operas, which were heavily influenced by Richard Wagner’s music dramas. Hallén was born in Gothenburg and died in Stockholm, but the early years of his career and most of his education were in Germany. Like his Norwegian contemporary Edvard Grieg and many other composers the same generation, Hallén frequently evokes the folk music and folk stories of his home country in his compositions. According to the musicologist Axel Helmer, however, "The salient feature of his style [...], and the one which strongly affected contemporary reaction, is its close, almost derivative relationship to German music," especially Wagner. Around 1885, Hallén returned to Sweden and continued to conduct and compose, and in later years taught composition at the Stockholm Conservatory.

Works

Operas
Harald der Wiking (1881) 
Harald Viking (1884) (Revised and translated version of Harald der Wiking)
Hexfällan (Witch’s trap) (1896) 
Valdemarskatten  (Valdemar’s Treasure) (1899) 
Valborgsmässa (Walpurgis Night) (1902) (Revised version of Hexfällan)

References

External links
Classical Composers Database - Johan Andreas Hallén

1846 births
1925 deaths
19th-century classical composers
20th-century classical composers
Swedish opera composers
Male opera composers
Romantic composers
Swedish classical composers
Swedish male classical composers
Swedish conductors (music)
Male conductors (music)
20th-century conductors (music)
20th-century Swedish male musicians
20th-century Swedish musicians
19th-century male musicians